Arenimonas daejeonensis is a Gram-negative, aerobic, rod-shaped and motile bacterium from the genus of Arenimonas which has been isolated from compost from Daejeon in Korea.

References

Xanthomonadales
Bacteria described in 2012